Civilized Man is the ninth studio album by the British artist Joe Cocker, released in May 1984, his first on Capitol label. It includes a cover of the 1981 Squeeze hit "Tempted", as well as "There Goes My Baby", a 1959 hit single from The Drifters.

Songs for the album were recorded at two different sessions. Side "A", recorded at Village Recorders in Los Angeles, was produced by Gary Katz and features as a backing band the core of the then current group Toto (Steve Lukather, Jeff Porcaro, and David Paich), whereas side "B", recorded in Nashville, was produced by Stewart Levine, and features Music City stalwarts (David Briggs, Reggie Young and Larrie Londin). The album also features an appearance by Joe Cocker's former bandmate Jim Keltner (on "Long Drag Off a Cigarette").

Civilized Man, along with its predecessor Sheffield Steel, marked the beginning of a new era of Joe Cocker albums, giving way to a much fuller style of production and taking more advantage of technology to experiment to produce more contemporary sounding music. Civilized Man expanded on the success of his previous album, selling well in Europe.

Track listing
 "Civilized Man" (Richard Feldman, Pat Robinson) – 3:55
 "There Goes My Baby" (Jerry Leiber, Mike Stoller, George Treadwell, Lover Patterson, Benjamin Nelson) – 3:47
 "Come On In" (Bob Telson) – 3:48
 "Tempted" (Chris Difford, Glenn Tilbrook) – 4:16
 "Long Drag Off a Cigarette" (Larry John McNally) – 2:35
 "I Love the Night" (Troy Seals, Michael Reid) – 3:47
 "Crazy in Love" (Randy McCormick, Even Stevens) – 3:51
 "A Girl Like You" (Troy Seals, Will Jennings) – 3:09
 "Hold On (I Feel Our Love Is Changing)" (Joe Sample, Will Jennings) – 3:41
 "Even a Fool Would Let Go" (Tom Snow, Kerry Chater) – 3:54

Personnel 

 Joe Cocker – lead vocals
 David Paich – Hammond organ (1, 4)
 Greg Phillinganes – Yamaha GS1 (1), Yamaha DX7 (2), acoustic piano (3-5)
 Rob Mounsey – acoustic piano (2), electric piano (3), Roland Jupiter-8 (5)
 Bob Telson – Oberheim OB-Xa (2, 3), Hammond organ (3), horn arrangements (4)
 David Briggs – keyboards (6, 8-10), string arrangements (7, 10)
 Shane Keister – synthesizers (6, 8-10)
 Randy McCormick – Fender Rhodes (7)
 Steve Lukather – guitar (1), electric guitar (2-4)
 Domenic Troiano – lead guitar (2), rhythm guitar (2), electric guitar (3)
 Larry John McNally – acoustic guitar (5)
 Jon Goin – guitar (6, 8, 10)
 Reggie Young – lead guitar (6), guitar (8)
 Pete Bordonali – guitar (7, 9)
 Dann Huff – guitar (7, 9), guitar solo (10)
 Dean Parks – guitar (9, 10)
 Nathan East – bass (1-5)
 Bob Wray – bass (6, 8)
 David Hungate – bass (7, 9, 10)
 Jeff Porcaro – drums (1-4)
 Jim Keltner – drums (5)
 Larrie Londin – drums (6, 8)
 James Stroud – drums (7, 9, 10)
 Starz Vanderlocket – percussion (1, 2, 4)
 Paulinho da Costa – percussion (6-8)
 Dave Tofani – tenor saxophone (4)
 Jim Horn – alto saxophone (8)
 Dave Bargeron – trombone (4)
 Randy Brecker – trumpet (4)
 Sid Sharp – strings (7, 10)
 Mary Davis – backing vocals (1, 4)
 Cissy Houston – backing vocals (1, 4)
 Deirdre Tuck Corley – backing vocals (1, 4)
 Bobbie Butler – backing vocals (2, 3)
 Sam Butler, Jr. – backing vocals (2, 3)
 James W. Carter – backing vocals (2, 3)
 Frank Floyd – backing vocals (3, 5)
 Zach Sanders – backing vocals (3, 5)
Julia Tillman Waters – backing vocals (9)
 Maxine Willard Waters – backing vocals (9)
 Luther Waters – backing vocals (9)
 Oren Waters – backing vocals (9)

Production 

 Producers – Gary Katz (Tracks 1-5); Stewart Levine (Tracks 6-10).
 Additional Production on Tracks 1-5 – Daniel Lazerus
 Engineers and Mixing – Daniel Lazerus (Tracks 1-5); Rik Pekkonen (Tracks 6-10).
 Assistant Engineers – Robin Lane and Phil Wagner (Tracks 1-5); Mark Ettel and Lynn Peterzell (Tracks 6-10).
 Additional Engineer on Tracks 6-10 – Mark Ettel 
 Mix Assistant on Tracks 1-5 – Wayne Yurgelon
 Recorded at The Village Recorder (Los Angeles, CA); Ocean Way Recording (Hollywood, CA); House of David (Nashville, TN); Soundworks Digital Audio/Video Studios (New York, NY).
 Digital Maintenance – Mike Morongell
 Mastered by Bob Ludwig at Masterdisk (New York, NY).
 Art Direction – Roy Kohara
 Design – John O’Brien
 Photography – Richard Avedon

Chart performance

Sales accomplishments

References

Joe Cocker albums
1984 albums
Albums produced by Gary Katz
Albums produced by Stewart Levine
Capitol Records albums